The Greater Khingan Range or Da Hinggan Range, is a -long volcanic mountain range in the Inner Mongolia region of Northeast China.
It was originally called the Xianbei Mountains, which later became the name of the northern branch of the Donghu, the Xianbei.

Geography
The range extends  from north to south. It is the watershed between the Nen and Songhua river systems to the east, and the Amur and its tributaries to the northwest.

Population
Its slopes are a relatively rich grazing area. The Khitan people lived on the eastern slopes before establishing the Liao Dynasty in the tenth century. Oroqen, a Tungusic people, live along the Greater and Lesser Khingan range in northeastern China and belong to the oldest autochthonus populations of the region. On the western slopes lived the nomadic people, who raised sheep and camels and used the Mongolian plateau for their pastoralist economy.

In Fiction
The Greater Khingan Range is a key setting in the science fiction novel The Three-Body Problem (novel) by Chinese author Liu Cixin.

See also
Daxing'anling Prefecture 
Lesser Khingan
Xing'an
Da Hinggan-Dzhagdy Mountains conifer forests

References

Mountain ranges of China
Landforms of Inner Mongolia
Xianbei